The Amarillo Bulls were a Tier II junior ice hockey team based in Amarillo, Texas. They were a member of the North American Hockey League's South Division and played home games in the Amarillo Civic Center.

History
The franchise joined the NAHL as the Albert Lea Thunder, located in Albert Lea, Minnesota, in 2008. During the second season, issues with ownership forced the league to step in to keep the team playing. On May 11, 2010, it was reported that the team had found new owners and would relocate to Texas for the 2010–11 season. Their franchise and roster were officially sold to the Amarillo ownership on May 26, 2010. On June 18, the team announced the new name, logo and colors of the team after a name-the-team contest.

The Amarillo Bulls announced their inaugural coach as Denis Williams, former NCAA Division I coach at Bowling Green. On May 13, 2013, the Bulls captured their first Robertson Cup Championship defeating the Wenatchee Wild 5–0 in the championship game. Following the 2013–14 season, coach Williams was named as the head coach of the expansion Bloomington Thunder of the United States Hockey League, a Tier I team and a recent addition to the Consolidated Sports Holdings portfolio.

In 2019, the team was sold to F&S Management Company LLC led by majority owner Alberto Fernandez. On March 5, 2021, it was announced that the team would relocate to Mason City, Iowa, starting in the 2021–22 season as the North Iowa Bulls, an organization that had been operating in the North American 3 Hockey League and also owned by Fernandez.

The Bulls were replaced in Amarillo by the Amarillo Wranglers in the 2021–22 season.

Season-by-season records

Playoffs
2011
Division Semifinals – Amarillo Bulls defeated Texas Tornado, 3-games-to-1
Division Finals – Amarillo Bulls defeated Topeka RoadRunners, 3-games-to-2
Robertson Cup Round Robin – Amarillo Bulls (2–1) - Qualify for Semifinal Game (W, 5–2 vs. Warriors; W, 5-3 vs. RoadRunners; L, 1–2 vs. Ice Dogs)
Robertson Cup Semifinal Game – Michigan Warriors defeated Amarillo Bulls, 6–2
2012
Division Semifinals – Amarillo Bulls defeated Odessa Jackalopes, 3-games-to-1
Division Finals – Amarillo Bulls defeated Topeka RoadRunners, 3-games-to-1
Robertson Cup Round Robin – Amarillo Bulls (1–2) - Qualify for Semifinal (OTW, 3–2 vs. Tornado; L, 1-3 vs. Ice Dogs; L, 2-6 vs. Bobcats)
Robertson Cup Semifinal Game – St. Louis Bandits defeated Amarillo Bulls, 3–2
2013
Division Semifinals – Amarillo Bulls defeated Corpus Christi IceRays, 3-games-to-1
Division Finals – Amarillo Bulls defeated Texas Tornado, 3-games-to-0
Robertson Cup Round Robin – Amarillo Bulls (2–1) - Qualify for Championship Game (OTW, 2–1 vs. Ironmmen; OTW, 2–1 vs. Bobcats; L, 0-7 vs. Wild)
Robertson Cup Final – Amarillo Bulls defeated Wenatchee Wild, 5-0
Robertson Cup Champions
2014
Division Semifinals – Amarillo Bulls defeated Wichita Falls Wildcats, 3-games-to-0
Division Finals – Topeka RoadRunners defeated Amarillo Bulls, 3-games-to-2
2019
Division Semifinals – Amarillo Bulls defeated Corpus Christi IceRays, 3-games-to-2
Division Finals – Amarillo Bulls defeated Shreveport Mudbugs, 3-games-to-2
Robertson Cup Semifinals – Aberdeen Wings defeated Amarillo Bulls, 2-games-to-12021
Division Semifinals – Shreveport Mudbugs''' defeated Amarillo Bulls, 3-games-to-1''

References

External links
 Official website

Defunct North American Hockey League teams
Ice hockey teams in Texas
Sports in Amarillo, Texas
Ice hockey clubs established in 2010
2010 establishments in Texas
Ice hockey clubs disestablished in 2021
2021 disestablishments in Texas